Emilíana Torrini (born 16 May 1977) is an Icelandic singer and songwriter. She is best known for her 2009 single "Jungle Drum", her 1999 album Love in the Time of Science, and her performance of "Gollum's Song" for the 2002 film The Lord of the Rings: The Two Towers.

Early life
Emilíana was born in Iceland, where she grew up in Kópavogur. At the age of seven, she joined a choir as a soprano, until she went to opera school at the age of 15. Her father, Salvatore Torrini, is Italian (from Naples), while her mother, Anna Stella Snorradóttir, is Icelandic. Because of name regulations in Iceland at the time, her father had to change his name to "Davíð Eiríksson", which also meant that Emilíana had to use the surname after her father in the traditional way. A few years later, the name regulations were changed, and she was again allowed to use her original surname. After being discovered singing in a restaurant in Iceland by Derek Birkett, the owner of One Little Indian Records, Emilíana was asked to visit London to record a song. She decided to stay in London.

Career

Emilíana has been a member of Icelandic artist group GusGus, and contributed vocals to several songs on their debut Polydistortion (1997), most notably "Why". She co-wrote Kylie Minogue's "Slow" and "Someday" from her Body Language album in 2003. She also produced "Slow" along with Dan Carey; the two were nominated for a Best Dance Recording Grammy Award in 2005 for their work on the track. Prior to these, Emilíana contributed vocals to songs on Thievery Corporation's 2002 album The Richest Man in Babylon and was credited with composing the songs "Resolution", "Until The Morning", and "Heaven's Gonna Burn Your Eyes" from that album. Also in 2002, she sang vocals on Paul Oakenfold's song "Hold Your Hand" taken from his Bunkka album.

Her version of Jefferson Airplane's 1967 song "White Rabbit" was used in multiple action and fight scenes in the action film Sucker Punch directed by Zack Snyder.

On 3 June 2013, Emilíana revealed to fans that she would release her new album on 9 September 2013 in the UK. The album was released in Ireland, Iceland, Germany, Austria, and Switzerland on 6 September 2013. The new LP is titled Tookah. Emilíana played a number of music festivals in the lead up to the album's release in Russia and Budapest.

On 29 July 2013, Emilíana revealed the radio edition of a new track "Speed of Dark". Three additional tracks were also revealed allowing fans to stream, including "Autumn Sun", "Animal Games", and "Tookah".

Emilíana was featured on Kid Koala's 2017 album Music to Draw To: Satellite, where she sang on seven tracks.

Discography 

Crouçie d'où là (1995)
Merman (1996)
Love in the Time of Science (1999)
Fisherman's Woman (2005)
Me and Armini (2008)
Tookah (2013)
Racing The Storm (2023)

References

External links 

 
 Unofficial Emilíana Torrini video archive
 Interview in the Sydney Morning Herald

1977 births
Emiliana Torrini
Virgin Records artists
Emiliana Torrini
Emiliana Torrini
Emiliana Torrini
Emiliana Torrini
Emiliana Torrini
Emiliana Torrini
Emiliana Torrini
Living people
One Little Independent Records artists
Emiliana Torrini
People of Campanian descent
Rough Trade Records artists
Folk-pop singers
Icelandic women in electronic music
21st-century Icelandic singers
Trip hop musicians
20th-century Icelandic women singers
21st-century Icelandic women singers
Icelandic people with family names
Indie pop musicians